Lautman is a surname. Notable people with the surname include:

 Albert Lautman (1908–1944), French mathematical philosopher
 Robert C. Lautman (1923–2009), American architectural photographer
 Rüdiger Lautmann (born 1935), German sociologist
 Victoria Lautman, American broadcast journalist